Liskeard was a parliamentary borough in Cornwall, which elected two Members of Parliament (MPs) to the House of Commons from 1295 until 1832, and then one member from 1832 until 1885. The constituency was abolished by the Redistribution of Seats Act 1885.

History 
The parliamentary borough was based upon the community of Liskeard in the south-eastern part of Cornwall.

Sedgwick estimated the electorate at 30 in 1740. Namier and Brooke considered it was about 50 in the 1754–1790 period. The right of election before 1832 was in the freemen of the borough. This constituency was under the patronage of the Eliot family, which acquired the predominant interest by 1722.

There were no contested elections between at least 1715 and 1802.  In the early 19th century the Whigs attempted to expand the electorate to include householders.  During the 1802 general election, 48 householders claimed the right to vote but their ballots were rejected by the Mayor (see the note to the 1802 election result below).  The Eliot family continued to control the borough in the Tory interest, for another thirty years.

The Reform Act 1832 augmented the freemen voters (who retained their ancient right votes), with the beneficiaries of a new householder franchise. The number of voters registered in 1832 was 218. The political effect of the change was that a Whig was elected unopposed to the one remaining seat in 1832, whereas the two Tory candidates had been elected unopposed at the previous seven general elections. Only Whig or Liberal candidates were returned from 1832 until the constituency was abolished.

The Reform Act 1867 preserved the borough constituency but slightly expanded the electorate (from 434 in 1865 to 881 in 1868). Liskeard was one of the smallest boroughs to retain individual representation in the 1868–1885 period. However the constituency was finally abolished by the Redistribution of Seats Act 1885, when the borough became part of the Bodmin or South East division of Cornwall.

Members of Parliament

1295–1629
 Constituency created (1295)

1640–1832

1832–1885

Election results 

Note on sources: The information for the election results given below is taken from Sedgwick 1715–1754, Namier and Brooke 1754–1790 and Stooks Smith 1790–1832. From 1832 the principal source was Craig, with additional or different information from Stooks Smith included. Candidates classified by Craig as Liberal before 1859, are labeled as Whig or Radical (following Stooks Smith) or Liberal if their exact allegiance is uncertain. Similarly candidates classified by Craig as Conservative but by Stooks Smith as Tory are listed below as Tory.

Note on percentage change calculations: Where there was only one candidate of a party in successive elections, for the same number of seats, change is calculated on the party percentage vote. Where there was more than one candidate for a party, in one or both successive contested elections for the same number of seats, then change is calculated on the individual candidates percentage vote.

Note on party allegiance of candidates: A party label is only used when the source used quotes one. Other candidates are labelled Non Partisan, but may have associated themselves with a tendency or faction in Parliament.

Elections before 1715
Dates of Parliaments 1660–1715

Note:-
 The MPs of the Parliament of England (elected 1705) and 45 members co-opted from the former Parliament of Scotland, became the House of Commons of the 1st Parliament of Great Britain in 1707.

Index to Election results 1715–1799

Index to Election results 1800–1885

Elections in the 1710s

Elections in the 1720s
 Trelawny became a Baronet in 1721

 Death of Eliot

Elections in the 1730s
 Seat vacated on Clutterbuck being appointed a Lord of the Admiralty

 Death of Dennis

Elections in the 1740s

Elections in the 1750s
 Seat vacated on the appointment of Trelawny as Assay-Master of Tin for the Duchy of Cornwall

 Seat vacated on the appointment of Nugent to an office

Elections in the 1760s

Elections in the 1770s

 Seat vacated on the appointment of Gibbon to an office

Elections in the 1780s

{{Election box candidate with party link|
 |party = Non Partisan
 |candidate = Edward James Eliot |votes = Unopposed
 |percentage = N/A
 |change = N/A
}}

 Seat vacated on the appointment of E.J. Eliot as Remembrancer of the Court of Exchequer

Elections in the 1790s

 Seat vacated on the appointment of E.J. Eliot as a Commissioner for India

 Death of E.J. Eliot

 Inchiquin was a peer of Ireland

Elections in the 1800s
 Resignation of Inchiquin

 Note (1800): Stooks Smith recorded that William Huskisson was returned unopposed at this by-election, but this appears to be an error.

 Note (1802): 48 householders claimed the right to vote. The ballots they tendered were rejected by the Mayor. 44 wanted to vote for Sheridan and Ogilvie, 3 for the Eliots and 1 for John Eliot and Sheridan.
 Succession of John Eliot as the 2nd Lord Eliot

 Note (1806): Stooks Smith does not give the votes for the elected candidates.

Elections in the 1810s

Elections in the 1820s

Elections in the 1830s

 Electorate expanded and constituency reduced to one seat, by the Reform Act 1832

 Note (1835): Stooks Smith recorded 211 registered electors, but the turnout is calculated on Craig's figure above

 Note (1837): Stooks Smith recorded 250 registered electors, but the turnout is calculated on Craig's figure above

Elections in the 1840s

 Note (1841): Stooks Smith recorded 285 registered electors, but the turnout is calculated on Craig's figure above
 Seat vacated on the appointment of Buller as Judge-Advocate General

 Note (1847): Stooks Smith recorded 333 registered electors, but the turnout is calculated on Craig's figure above
 Seat vacated on the appointment of Buller as President of the Poor Law Board

 Death of Buller

Elections in the 1850s

 Seat vacated on the appointment of Crowder as a Judge of the Court of Common Pleas

 The Whig Party is regarded as having merged into a new Liberal Party, which was formed at a meeting of the supporters of Lord Palmerston on 6 July 1859; although Whigs and Radicals had been informally referred to collectively as Liberals for decades.
 Seat vacated on the appointment of Grey as a Collector of Customs

Elections in the 1860s
  Resignation of Osborne 

  Electorate expanded by the Reform Act 1867

 Death of Buller

Elections in the 1870s

 Death of Horsman

Elections in the 1880s

 Electorate expanded by the Representation of the People Act 1884, but the constituency was abolished by the Redistribution of Seats Act 1885 with effect from the 1885 United Kingdom general election.

 Notes and references NotesReferences'Sources 

  The History of Parliament Trust, Lostwithiel, Borough from 1386 to 1868
D Brunton & D H Pennington, Members of the Long Parliament (London: George Allen & Unwin, 1954)Cobbett's Parliamentary history of England, from the Norman Conquest in 1066 to the year 1803 (London: Thomas Hansard, 1808) 
F W S Craig, "British Parliamentary Election Results 1832–1885" (2nd edition, Aldershot: Parliamentary Research Services, 1989)
 J Holladay Philbin, Parliamentary Representation 1832 – England and Wales (New Haven: Yale University Press, 1965)
 Boundaries of Parliamentary Constituencies 1885–1972, compiled and edited by F.W.S. Craig (Parliamentary Reference Publications 1972)
 The House of Commons 1715–1754, by Romney Sedgwick (HMSO 1970)
 The House of Commons 1754–1790, by Sir Lewis Namier and John Brooke (HMSO 1964)
 The Parliaments of England by Henry Stooks Smith (1st edition published in three volumes 1844–50), second edition edited (in one volume) by F.W.S. Craig (Political Reference Publications 1973)) out of copyright Who's Who of British Members of Parliament: Volume I 1832–1885, edited by M. Stenton (The Harvester Press 1976)
 Who's Who of British Members of Parliament, Volume II 1886–1918'', edited by M. Stenton and S. Lees (Harvester Press 1978)

Constituencies of the Parliament of the United Kingdom established in 1295
Constituencies of the Parliament of the United Kingdom disestablished in 1885
Parliamentary constituencies in Cornwall (historic)
Rotten boroughs